Patnos (Armenian:  Բադնոց, Latin transliteration: Badnoc‘ or Patnoc‘, Kurdish: Panos) was a historically important Armenian city, and now a city of Ağrı Province of Turkey on a plain surrounded by high mountains including Süphan, watered by tributaries of the Murat River. It is 82 km south of the city of Ağrı on the road to Van. It is the seat of Patnos District. Its population is 61,837 (2021). The mayor is Emrah Kılıç (HDP).

The plain has been settled since at least 1300BC and this was a centre of the Urartu civilisation. The city has many historical ruins from Urartian period. There are a number of places of historical interest around Patnos, including the castle of Aznavur Tepe, an impressive Urartu building.

Today Patnos is a small town in an impoverished rural area.

References

Populated places in Ağrı Province
Kurdish settlements in Turkey
Important Bird Areas of Turkey